The FIL European Luge Championships, part of the International Luge Federation (FIL) have taken place since 1914. From 1914 to 1934, these championships were part of the Internationaler Schlittensportsverband (ISSV - International Sled Sport Federation in ). From 1935 to 1956, the championships were held under the auspices of the Fédération Internationale de Bobsleigh et de Tobogganing (FIBT - International Bobsleigh and Tobagganing Federation in ). Since 1962, the event has been under the auspices of the FIL and has been held in even-numbered years since 1980. Since 2012, it is held annually.

For information on natural track luge championships in Europe, please see FIL European Luge Natural Track Championships, which have been contested since 1970.

Host cities
1914: Reichenberg, Bohemia (part of Austria-Hungary)
1928: Schreiberhau, Germany
1929: Semmering, Austria
1934: Ilmenau, Germany
1935: Krynica, Poland
1937: Oslo, Norway
1938: Salzburg, Austria
1939: Reichenberg, Germany (Czechoslovakia was under Nazi Germany then)
1951: Innsbruck, Austria
1952: Garmisch-Partenkirchen, West Germany
1953: Cortina d'Ampezzo, Italy
1954: Davos, Switzerland
1955: Hahnenklee, West Germany
1956: Imst, Austria
1957-61: Events cancelled.
1962: Weißenbach, Austria
1963-6: Events cancelled.
1967: Königssee, West Germany
1968-9: Events cancelled.
1970: Hammarstrand, Sweden
1971: Imst, Austria
1972: Königssee, West Germany
1973: Königssee, West Germany
1974: Imst, Austria
1975: Olang, Italy
1976: Hammarstrand, Sweden
1977: Königssee, West Germany
1978: Hammarstrand, Sweden
1979: Oberhof, East Germany
1980: Olang, Italy
1982: Winterberg, West Germany
1984: Olang, Italy
1986: Hammarstrand, Sweden
1988: Königssee, West Germany
1990: Innsbruck, Austria
1992: Winterberg, Germany
1994: Königssee, Germany
1996: Sigulda, Latvia
1998: Oberhof, Germany
2000: Winterberg, Germany
2002: Altenberg, Germany
2004: Oberhof, Germany
2006: Winterberg, Germany
2008: Cesana, Italy
2010: Sigulda, Latvia
2012: Paramonovo, Russia
2013: Oberhof, Germany
2014: Sigulda, Latvia
2015: Sochi, Russia
2016: Altenberg, Germany
2017: Königssee, Germany
2018: Sigulda, Latvia
2019: Oberhof, Germany
2020: Lillehammer, Norway
2021: Sigulda, Latvia
2022: St. Moritz, Switzerland
2023: Sigulda, Latvia

Men's singles
Debuted: 1914

Medal table

Women's singles
Debuted: 1914 (unofficial), 1928 (official)

Medal table

European Championships 1914 (not recognized by the FIL) included

Men's doubles
Debuted: 1914 as open event to men and women. 2023: changed to men's doubles

Medal table

Women's doubles
Debuted: 2023

Medal table

Mixed team
Debuted: 1988 as six members per team. 2000: changed to four members per team. 2008: changed to mixed team relay.

Medal table

Medal table
Updated after the 2023 FIL European Luge Championships.

Multiple medalists
Boldface denotes active lugers and highest medal count among all lugers (including these who not included in these tables) per type.

Men

Women

References
FIL-Luge.org list of European luge champions  - Accessed January 31, 2008.
https://web.archive.org/web/20110718204018/http://bsd-portal.de/index.php?id=381&cHash=0e8470ad29&tx_ttnews[tt_news]=1241 List of European Luge champions: 1914-53.  - accessed 8 February 2010.
Men's doubles European champions
Men's singles European champions
Mixed teams European champions
Women's singles European champions

 
Luge competitions
Recurring sporting events established in 1914